Frank Harris Hitchcock (October 5, 1867 – August 5, 1935), was chairman of Republican National Committee from 1908 to 1909. He was then Postmaster General of the United States under President William Howard Taft from 1909 to 1913.

Biography
Frank Harris Hitchcock was born in Amherst, Ohio on October 5, 1867.

According to historian David Leighton, "He graduated from Harvard in 1891 and the George Washington University Law School in 1894. During his time at Harvard he met Theodore Roosevelt at the Audubon Society, both sharing a passion for the study of birds. Hitchcock credited Roosevelt for his success at the national level: From 1897 to 1905 Hitchcock served in the departments of Agriculture and Commerce. From 1905-08, he was assistant postmaster general."

He is credited with establishing the first U.S. airmail service.  As Postmaster General, he made prosecution of mail fraud a top priority, and led a major crackdown on people using the mails to sell shares in worthless companies. He's also credited with starting the US Postal Service's Operation Santa in 1912, instructing local postmasters to let workers and citizens respond to Santa letters that were popping up in post offices. 

Hitchcock moved to Arizona in 1928 where he invested in mining and was an owner of the Tucson Citizen. He advocated for the creation of Catalina Highway and Saguaro National Monument. Frank Harris Hitchcock died in Tucson, Arizona on August 5, 1935.

Images

Notes

External links

 David Leighton, "Street Smarts: General Hitchcock Highway remembers a man whose influence went from D.C. to Tucson and back," Arizona Daily Star, Feb. 25, 2014

|-

1867 births
1935 deaths
20th-century American politicians
Arizona Republicans
Burials at Mount Auburn Cemetery
George Washington University Law School alumni
Harvard University alumni
Ohio Republicans
People from Amherst, Ohio
Republican National Committee chairs
Taft administration cabinet members
United States Postmasters General